was a village located in Higashikanbara District, Niigata Prefecture, Japan.

As of 2003, the village had an estimated population of 3,216 and a density of 8.91 persons per km². The total area was 361.13 km².

On April 1, 2005, Kamikawa, along with the towns of Kanose and Tsugawa, and the village of Mikawa (all from Higashikanbara District) were merged to create the town of Aga.

Dissolved municipalities of Niigata Prefecture
Aga, Niigata